In the 1984–85 season Panathinaikos played for 26th consecutive time in Greece's top division, the Alpha Ethniki. They also competed in the European Cup and the Greek Cup.

Squad

Competitions

Alpha Ethniki

Classification

European Cup
First round

|}
Second round

|}
Quarter-finals

|}
Semi-finals

|}

References

External links
 Panathinaikos FC official website

Panathinaikos F.C. seasons
Panathinaikos